Also see List of Royal Variety Performances.
The following is a list of acts that have appeared on the Royal Variety Performance. It includes the years which each act appeared.



0-9
42nd Street: 1985

A

a-ha: 1988
Russ Abbot: 1988
Three Aberdonians: 1938
Philip Achille: 2007
The Acrobats: 1984
Adam and the Ants: 1981
Edie Adams: 1962
Tony Adams: 1982
Errol Addison: 1932
Adele: 2010
Jules Adrian: 1945
African Footprint: 2000
Max Again: 1970
Roberto Alagna: 1998
Terry Alderton: 1999
Charles Aldrich: 1912
Michael Aldridge: 1955 (London)
Aleggria House Troupe: 1997
Peter Alex-Newton: 1985
Fred Allandale: 1921
Chesney Allen: 1951, 1954, 1980
Les Allen: 1938
Herb Alpert's Tijuana Brass: 1969
The Amandis: 1955 (Blackpool)
Scott Ambler: 1997
Shirley Ambrose: 1958
Stephen K. Amos: 2007
Anastacia: 2002, 2009
Clive Anderson: 1994
Moira Anderson: 1969, 1978, 1982
Victor Andre: 1928
Eamonn Andrews: 1953
Julie Andrews: 1948, 1958, 1977
Brian Andro: 1984
Paul Anka: 1977
Josephine Anne: 1955 (Blackpool)
Annie - the Musical: 1998, 2017
The cast of Animal Crackers: 1998
Antonio and his Spanish Ballet Company: 1958
The Argentine Gauchos: 1989
Armstrong and Miller: 2008
Rob Ashley: 1938
The Seven Ashtons: 1949
Arthur Askey: 1946, 1948, 1952, 1954, 1955 (Blackpool), 1957, 1959, 1968, 1978, 1980
Michael Aspel: 1985
The Three Astaires: 1947
A.C. Astor: 1928
Eileen Atkins: 1984
Rosalind Atkinson: 1938
Rowan Atkinson: 1980, 1990
Richard Attenborough: 1955 (London), 1990
Winifred Atwell: 1952, 1957
Madge Aubrey: 1932
The Nine Avalons: 1945
The cast of Avenue Q: 2006
Pam Ayres: 1977
Charles Aznavour: 1975

B

B*Witched: 1998
Babes on Broadway: 1985
Burt Bacharach: 1963
Vernel Bagneris: 1981
Alan Bailey: 1947
Jim Bailey: 1992
Cecil Bainbridge: 1923
Josephine Baker: 1974
Kenny Ball: 1961, 1978
Michael Ball: 1989, 1991, 1992, 1997, 2007
Kaye Ballard: 1950
Scottish Ballet: 1978
Bananarama: 1988
Band of the Training Ship: 1946
The Band that Jack Built: 1950
John Barbirolli: 1959
The Three Barbour Brothers: 1952
The Barbour Brothers and Jean: 1955 (Blackpool)
Lawrence Barclay: 1933
Wilkie Bard: 1912
John Barrowman: 2006, 2008
Michael Barrymore: 1983, 1987, 1993
Biddy Barton: 1938
Sam Barton: 1919
Jack Barty: 1938
Count Basie and his Orchestra: 1957, 1975
Alfie Bass: 1959
Shirley Bassey: 1961, 1965, 1971, 1975, 1976, 1987, 1994, 2000, 2005, 2014
The Bachelors: 1964, 1966
BBC Northern Dance Orchestra: 1959
Dick Beamish: 1946
The Beatles: 1963
Robert Beatty: 1955 (London)
The Beautiful Game: 2000
Gilbert Bécaud: 1966, 1976
Daniel Bedingfield: 2003
Bee Gees: 1993
Harry Belafonte: 1977
Arthur Bell: 1949
The Bell Ringers: 1984
The Bells: 1932
Nicola Benedetti: 2005
Billy Bennett: 1926, 1933, 1934
Tony Bennett: 1965, 1994
Jack Benny: 1950, 1961, 1965
Barbara Bentham: 1946
Michael Bentine: 1949
Dick Bentley: 1954
The Three Bentley Sisters: 1950
George and Bert Bernard: 1948
Veit Bethke: 1953
Danny Bhoy: 2003
Beverley Sisters: 1952, 1958, 1978
Acker Bilk: 1961, 1978, 1981
The cast of Billy: 1975
Billy Elliot the Musical: 2004
Birmingham Royal Ballet: 1999
Cilla Black: 1964, 1969, 1993
Joe Black: 1982
Stanley Black and the Dance Orchestra: 1951
Tom Blacklock: 1927, 1931
The Black light theatre of Prague: 1970
Blackpool Tower Ballet children: 1955 (Blackpool), 1959
The Blackpool Tower Circusettes: 1948
Vivian Blaine: 1953
Joyce Blair: 1982
Lionel Blair: 1961, 1968, 1976, 1978, 1980, 1990
Norah Blaney: 1921
Blast! (musical): 2000
Newton Blick: 1955 (London)
The Bluebell Girls: 1967
The Bluebells: 1986
Blue Man Group: 2005
James Blunt: 2007, 2017
Wally Boag: 1947
Andrea Bocelli: 1999, 2005
Alfie Boe: 2010
The Bogannys: 1912
Bolshoi Ballet: 1992
Michael Bolton: 1997
Bombay Dreams: 2002
Bond the legend: 2002
Boney M.: 1979
Bon Jovi: 2007
The Three Bonos: 1934
Pat Boone: 1958
Elayne Boosler: 1989
Tony Booth: 1972
Webster Booth: 1945
David Bor: 1930
Victor Borge: 1980, 1986, 1996
Yamil Borges: 2004
Frank Boston: 1934
Eve Boswell: 1953
Patti Boulaye: 1981
Matthew Bourne's Swan Lake: 1997
Simon Bowman: 1985
Max Boyce: 1978
Katie Boyle: 1954
Boyzone: 1998
Melvyn Bragg: 1989
Wilfrid Brambell: 1963
Russell Brand: 2007
Betsy Brantley: 1985
The cast of Bread: 1988
Rory Bremner: 1986
Rose Brennan: 1963
Gerry Brereton: 1952
Bernard Bresslaw: 1958
Sarah Brightman: 1985, 1987, 1990
Alan Brind: 1987
The British Amateur Gymnastics Team: 1983
Jon Jon Briones: 2014
Ronnie Brody: 1955 (London)
Bob Bromley and his puppets: 1946
Pamela Bromley: 1955 (Blackpool)
June Bronhill: 1958
Jimmy Brooks: 1957
Colette Brosset: 1955 (London)
Brotherhood of Man: 1977
Sam Browne: 1935, 1951
Barbara Bruce: 1951
Frank Bruno: 1989
Dora Bryan: 1959
Yul Brynner: 1979
Michael Bublé: 2004, 2009
Jack Buchanan: 1932, 1954
Bucks Fizz: 1982
Francis Bunn: 1963
Lillian Burgess: 1926, 1928
Alexandra Burke: 2009
George Burns: 1961
Donald Burr: 1952
Geoffrey Burridge): 1985
Reginald Burston: 1945
Jane Burton: 1958
Lance Burton: 1989
Darcey Bussell: 1990, 1996, 2007
Busted: 2003
Earnest Butcher: 1922
Jean Butler: 1999
Red Buttons: 1979
Sheila Buxton: 1959
Max Bygraves: 1950, 1952, 1953, 1954, 1957, 1958, 1960, 1961, 1965, 1970, 1976, 1978, 1984, 1986
Douglas Byng: 1955 (London)
Ed Byrne: 1999
Peter Byrne: 1945
Jason Byrne: 2006

C

Montserrat Caballé: 1992
The Cabana Accordion Six: 1946
Simon Cadell: 1990
Caesar Twins: 2005
Marti Caine: 1978, 1979, 1986
Michael Caine: 1990
James Cairncross: 1955 (London)
The Cairoli Brothers: 1946
Charlie Cairoli with Paul: 1955 (Blackpool)
Simon Callow: 1984
Eddie Calvert: 1954
Cambridge Buskers: 1981
George Cameron: 1952
Jean Campbell: 1953
Cannon and Ball: 1987
Capital Voices: 2004, 2006
George Carden: 1955 (London)
The George Carden Dancers: 1957, 1958
The George Carden Ensemble: 1952
Rudy Cardenas: 1962
Cardini: 1933
Odali Careno: 1930
George Carl: 1974, 1983, 1987
Elsie Carlisle: 1935
Henry Carlisle: 1937
Willie Carlisle: 1947
The Carmenas: 1965
George Carney: 1938
Kate Carney: 1935, 1938
Bal Caron Trio: 1966
Harry Carpenter: 1989
Carr & Parr: 1926
Alan Carr: 2005
Jimmy Carr: 2002, 2004, 2008
Vikki Carr: 1967
Pearl Carr: 1953
José Carreras: 1985
Frank Carson: 1986, 1992
Billy Caryll: 1933
Jim Casey: 1982
Billy Castle: 1946
Roy Castle: 1958, 1959, 1969, 1974, 1982, 1985, 1993
The cast of Cats: 1992
Peter Cavanagh: 1949
The Cavendish Singers: 1951
Christopher Cazenove: 1990
Julia Channing: 1955 (London)
Topsy Chapman: 1981
Cyd Charisse: 1986
The Charlivels: 1958
Charlie Chester: 1946, 1980
Charlie Chester and his Radio Gang: 1948
Harry Champion: 1932, 1935, 1938
Dawson Chance: 1976
Carol Channing: 1972
The Eight Charlies: 1963
Cher: 2001
Maurice Chevalier: 1949, 1952, 1961
Chicago: 1997
George H. Chirgwin: 1912
Chilton & Thomas: 1930
The Chinese Classical Theatre Company: 1955 (London)
Chinese State Circus: 1992
The Chongqing Troupe: 1988
Paul Christian: 1958
Christoper and Columbus: 1932
Charlotte Church: 1999, 2001, 2005
Diana Churchill: 1954
Paul Cinquevalli: 1912
Cirque du Soleil: 1995, 2000, 2001, 2003
Clapham and Dwyer: 1938
Petula Clark: 1968
P.L. Clark: 1927, 1931
The Clark Brothers: 1963, 1981
The Dave Clark Five: 1965
Petula Clark: 1986
Thais Clark: 1981
George Clarke: 1930, 1932, 1934
Julian Clary: 2000, 2001
Laddie Cliff: 1923
Denise Clifford: 1945
Bernie Clifton: 1979
Jimmy Clitheroe: 1959
Rosemary Clooney: 1962, 1987
Martin Clunes: 2000
Eric Coates: 1949
Aileen Cochrane: 1959
Peggy Cochrane: 1938
The Band of the Coldstream Guards: 1952
Alma Cogan: 1955 (London), 1957
 Cheryl Cole: 2010
George Cole: 1982
Natalie Cole: 2002
Maurice Colleano: 1945
Lesley Collier: 1978, 1982, 1986
Norman Collier: 1971
Joan Collins: 1985
The Colstons: 1948
Perry Como: 1974
The Company: 1933
Brian Conley: 1988, 1992, 1993, 1994, 1995, 1996
Kenneth Connor: 1982
Contact: 2002
Tom Conti: 1992
Russ Conway: 1959, 1960
Steve Coogan: 1992, 1996
Barbara Cook: 1997
Peter Cook: 1965
Phil Cool: 1998
Adam Cooper: 1997
Gladys Cooper: 1954
Terence Cooper: 1958
Tommy Cooper: 1953, 1957, 1964, 1967, 1971, 1977
Jonathon Cope: 1996
Coram: 1930
Harry H. Corbett: 1963
Ronnie Corbett: 1969, 1973, 1984, 1986, 1988, 1994, 2000, 2003
The cast of Coronation Street: 1989
Corps De Ballet: 1953
The Corrs: 1999, 2001, 2015
Joaquín Cortés: 1996
Three Cossacks: 1935
Billy Cotton and his Band: 1950, 1952, 1960
Henry Cotton: 1953
Yvonne Coulette: 1955 (London)
Noël Coward: 1954
Crompton: 1952
Cicely Courtneidge: 1932, 1937, 1951
Wendy Craig: 1978
The Crastonians: 1938
Joe Crastonian: 1947
Gemma Craven: 1983
Michael Crawford: 1975, 1992
The Crazy Gang: 1933, 1937, 1948, 1951, 1952, 1954, 1955 (Blackpool), 1955 (London), 1957, 1960, 1961
Martin Crewes: 2000
Jimmy Cricket: 1984
Walter Crisham: 1954, 1955 (London)
Ida Crispi: 1912
Annie Croft: 1921
The Cromwells: 1948
Raymond Crowe: 2007
Leslie Crowther: 1970, 1978, 1982, 1984, 1987, 1990
Bobby Crush: 1978
Hal Cruttenden: 2009
Jamie Cullum: 2003
Jon Culshaw: 2001
Peggy Cummins: 1954
James Currie's Water Spectacle: 1947
Mark Curry: 1990
Tim Curry: 1982
Sammy Curtis: 1946
Paul Cutts: 1954
Cynthia & Gladys: 1947
Miley Cyrus: 2009
Czechoslovakian State Song and Dance Ensemble: 1968

D

The cast of Dad's Army: 1975
The Dagenham Girl Pipers: 1938, 1947
Dailey and Wayne: 1971
Billy Dainty: 1974, 1980, 1982, 1983, 1984
Olivia Dale: 1956
Lorna Dallas: 1982
Tyne Daly: 1986
Michael Dalton: 1951
Chappie D'Amato: 1945
The Dancers: 1984
Dance Theatre of Harlem: 1974, 1976
The Dancin' Company: 1983
Suzanne Danielle: 1982
Paul Daniels: 1978, 1984, 1988
Johnny Dankworth: 1962, 1977
Alec Dane: 1934
Billy Danvers: 1932, 1948
Danya and Alvarez: 1953
Dany Daniel & Edina: 2007
Albert Darnley: 1921
Craig David: 2001
David and Dania: 2006
Gloria Davidson: 1958
Jim Davidson: 1979, 1981, 1996, 1997
Arthur Davies: 1990
Tessa Davies: 1963
Tudor Davies: 1985
Sammy Davis, Jr.: 1960, 1961, 1966, 1980
Michael Davis: 1986
Bobby Davro: 1987
Anna Dawson: 1982
Harry Dawson: 1953
Les Dawson: 1973, 1979, 1987
Darren Day: 1993
Frances Day: 1951
Jill Day: 1959
Laurie Day: 1938
Natasha Day: 2007
Vera Day: 1955 (Blackpool)
Alfie Dean: 1946
Chris de Burgh: 1989
Deep River Boys: 1952
The Debonairs: 1950
Roger De Courcey: 1976
Kiki Dee: 1992
De Groot: 1930
Luis Alberto del Paraná: 1963
Leo De Lyon: 1957
Delya: 1945
Michael Denison: 1954, 1990
The Harry Dennis Dance Sexette: 1937
Les Dennis: 1984
Manitas de Plata and Company: 1968
Florence Desmond: 1937, 1951
Jerry Desmonde: 1945, 1946, 1954, 1957, 1958
David Devant: 1912
Jeanne Devereaux: 1935
Steve Devereaux: 1985
The Mary De Vere Dancers: 1951
The Pamela Devis Dancers: 1970
Dora de Winton: 1923
Robert Dhery: 1955 (London)
The Diamond Brothers: 1935
Sandra Dickinson: 1978
Marlene Dietrich: 1963
Jayne and Adam Di Gatano: 1948
Celine Dion: 1997
The Dior Dancers: 1958, 1959
Sacha Distel: 1967, 1971
Diversity: 2009, 2012, 2016
Bob Dixon: 1970
Reg Dixon: 1949, 1952
Reginald Dixon: 1955 (Blackpool)
Omid Djalili: 2002, 2006
Wayne Dobson: 1990
Jamieson Dodd: 1923
Ken Dodd: 1965, 1967, 1972, 1986, 1999, 2006
Anton Dolin: 1928, 1935
Plácido Domingo: 1990
Lonnie Donegan: 1960, 1981
Donovan: 1981
George Doonan: 1945
Val Doonican: 1967, 1968, 1986
Lita D'Oray: 1938
The Doriss Girls: 1970
Diana Dors: 1955 (London), 1960
Jack Douglas: 1966
Gil Dova: 1964
Anthony Dowell: 1983
Bob Downe: 1995
Charlie Drake: 1958, 1963, 1978, 1980, 1984
Alfred Drake: 1955 (London)
Simon Drake: 1992
The Drambuie Kirklston Pipe Band: 2003
Eleanor Drew: 1955 (London)
Du Calion: 1919, 1922
Bernard Dudley: 1923
Duffy: 2008
Dukes and Lee: 1975
Colin Dunne: 1999
Viviana Durante: 1994
Jack Durrant: 1947
Christian Duvalein: 1955 (London)
Norah Dwyer: 1934

E

Shirley Eaton: 1954
Sheena Easton: 1980, 1982
The cast of EastEnders: 1986
Eclipse 1998
Paul Eddington: 1984
Jack Edge: 1927, 1931
Noel Edmonds: 1979
Jimmy Edwards: 1951, 1952, 1953, 1955 (London), 1960
Gus Elen: 1935
El Granadas and Peter: 1946
Duke Ellington and his Orchestra: 1973
G. H. Elliott: 1925, 1948, 1958
Peter Elliott: 1958
Kerry Ellis: 2008
John Ellison: 1952
Elsa and Waldo: 1949
Ben Elton: 2000
Bella Emberg: 1988
Dick Emery: 1973
Empire Pool Festival Choir: 1953
The World Cup winning England football team: 1966
English National Ballet: 2007
English National Opera: 2004
Arthur English: 1951, 1980
Enya: 1997
Erasure: 1988
David Essex: 1989
Gloria Estefan: 1992, 2003
Eternal: 1996
Eugene's Magyar band: 1932
David Evans: 1951
Fred Evans: 1983, 1985
Norman Evans: 1937, 1947, 1951
Dame Edna Everage: 1984, 2013

F

Adam Faith: 1960
Paloma Faith: 2017
Fame – The Musical: 1997
Gwen Farrar: 1921
Fred Farrn: 1912
Alice Faye: 1985
Tony Fayne: 1951
Marty Feldman: 1970
Stuart Fell: 1984
Felix Felton: 1958
Joaquin Pérez Fernandes and his Latin American Company: 1951
John Field: 1955 (Blackpool)
Sid Field: 1945, 1946
Brent Fields: 1946
Fanny Fields: 1912
Gracie Fields: 1928, 1937, 1947, 1950, 1951, 1952, 1957, 1964
Frank Finlay: 1984
Christine Finn: 1955 (London)
Dudu Fisher: 1987
Eddie Fisher with the BBC Northern Orchestra: 1955 (Blackpool)
Five Star: 1987
Bud Flanagan: 1947, 1951, 1954, 1957, 1960
Flanagan and Allen: 1932, 1933, 1935, 1950, 1955 (Blackpool)
Michael Flanders: 1963
Tim Flavin: 1985
The Flemings: 1922
Cyril Fletcher: 1978, 1980
Graham Fletcher: 1983, 1985
Jimmy Fletcher: 1935
Mr. Flotsam and Mr. Jetsam: 1927, 1931
Flur na H-alba: 2003
The Flying Banvards: 1919
The Flying De Pauls: 1955 (Blackpool)
Florence and Frederic: 1954
The cast of Folies Bergère: 1989
Rosemarie Ford: 1989
Florrie Forde: 1935, 1938
The Ford Motor Works Military Band: 1958
Andy Ford: 1997
Forever Plaid: 1993
Hugh Forgie: 1966
George Formby: 1937, 1955 (Blackpool)
Bruce Forsyth: 1958, 1971, 1975, 1980, 1988
Del Foss: 1935
Teddy Foster: 1938
Aline Fournier: 1933
Roy Fox and his band: 1933
Boy Foy: 1935
Betty Frankiss: 1938
Aretha Franklin: 1980
Bill Fraser: 1959
Nina & Frederik: 1961
David Frost: 1989
Stephen Fry: 1987, 1990
Loie Fuller Band: 1923
The Full Monty: 2001
Funny Girls: 2004, 2005
Will Fyffe: 1922, 1925, 1932, 1937

G

Christopher Gable: 1966
Miklos Gafni: 1951
Lady Gaga: 2009, 2016
Zoe Gail: 1952
Pamela Gale: 1958
Helen Gallagher: 1950
James Galway: 1979, 1984, 1987, 1990
Barclay Gammon: 1912
Ganjou Brothers and Juanita: 1933, 1937
The Three Garcias: 1947
Judy Garland: 1957
Lesley Garrett: 1993
Jill Gascoine: 1990
Gaston and Andree: 1933, 1938
Stephen Gately: 1998
Gareth Gates: 2002
Pearly Gates: 1981
Anthony Gatto: 1984
Dustin Gee: 1984
Helen Gelzer: 1982
Roy Genson: 1958
Phillipe Genty and Company: 1973
Muriel George: 1922
Billy Geraghty: 1999
Geraldo and his Tango Orchestra: 1933, 1955 (Blackpool)
Ernie Gerrard: 1935
Angela Gheorghiu: 1994, 1998
Carroll Gibbons: 1951
Mary Gibbs: 1921
Debbie Gibson: 1993
John Gielgud: 1990
Gigi: 1985
Beniamino Gigli: 1952
Lewis Gilbert: 1923
Rhod Gilbert: 2008
Girls Aloud: 2004, 2012
Gertie Gitana: 1948
Peter Glaze: 1955 (Blackpool), 1982
Evelyn Glennie: 1987
Sharon Gless: 1986, 1992
Paddy Glyn: 1959
Tommy Godfrey: 1982
Jimmy Gold: 1951
Whoopi Goldberg: 2009
The Golden Girls: 1988
Bob Golding as Eric Morecambe: 2009
Henry Goodman: 1997
Delta Goodrem: 2004
Ken Goodwin: 1971
Peter Goodwright: 1987
The Goofers: 1957
Noele Gordon: 1949, 1974
Philip Gould: 1985, 1992
Nadezhda Gracheva: 1992
Russell Grant: 1984
Stéphane Grappelli: 1971, 1986
George Graves: 1938
Billy Gray: 1982
Dolores Gray: 1947, 1949, 1987
Dulcie Gray: 1954, 1990
Larry Grayson: 1994
Grease: 1993
Gillian Gregory: 1983
Band of the Grenadier Guards: 1990
Beryl Grey: 1955 (Blackpool)
'Monsewer' Eddie Gray: 1933, 1946, 1951
Ronnie Grearder: 1938
The Great Alexander Troupe: 1948
Buddy Greco: 1963
Juliette Gréco: 1966
Harry Green: 1954
Hughie Green: 1971
John Gregson: 1955 (London)
Joe Greig: 1955
Larry Gretton: 1963
Mona Grey: 1927, 1931
Griffith Brothers: 1923
Lydia Griffiths: 1997
Grigorovich Ballet of the Bolshoi Theatre: 1993
Marion Grimaldi: 1958
Josh Groban: 2004, 2008
Grock: 1919
Martin Guerre: 1996
Guys and Dolls cast members: 1953, 1985, 2005
Paul Gyngell: 1992
Gypsy: A Musical Fable: 2001
The Gypsy Boys Band: 1937

H

Larry Hagman: 1980
The cast of Hairspray: 2007
Halama and Konarski: 1946
Binnie Hale: 1950, 1954
Hale and Pace: 1987, 1995
Bill Haley & His Comets: 1979
The West End cast of Half a Sixpence: 1963
Adelaide Hall: 1951
Rena Hall: 1923
Henry Hall and the BBC Dance Orchestra: 1934
The Hallé Orchestra: 1959
Johnny Hallyday: 1965
Chico Hamilton Quartette: 1964
Marvin Hamlisch: 1995
Tony Hancock: 1958
Tommy Handley 1923, 1938
John Hanson: 1982
The Alan Harding Dancers: 1987
Cedric Hardwicke: 1934
Robert Hardy: 1990
Herbert Hare: 1954
Howell Harger: 1930
Dolly Harmer: 1927, 1931
The Harmony Revellers: 1935
Anita Harris: 1981, 1990
Bob Harris: 1955 (London)
Keith Harris: 1984
Rolf Harris: 1967, 1978, 1985
Richard Harris: 1982
Rex Harrison: 1958
Harrison & Fisher: 1935
Harold Hart: 1938
June Hart: 1934
Russell Harty: 1985
Harvey: 1949
Harvey and the Wallbangers: 1984
Bill Harvey: 1958
Judith Harvey: 1958
Ernest Hastings: 1919
Will Hatton: 1938
Jeremy Hawk: 1955 (London)
Will Hay 1925, 1928, 1930, 1945
Will Hay Jnr : 1930
Sessue Hayakawa: 1923
J. Milton Hayes: 1921, 1925
Rick Hayes: 1926
Arthur Haynes: 1961, 1965
Hy Hazell: 1947
Rupert Hazell: 1923
David Healy: `1985
Hear’Say: 2001
Richard Hearne: 1938, 1954
Ted Heath and his Band: 1948, 1954
The Heavy Cavalry and Cambrai Band: 2007, 2009
Dick Henderson: 1926, 1946
Dickie Henderson: 1957, 1959, 1962, 1963, 1972, 1981
Billy Hendrix: 1933
Herschel Henlere: 1957
Lenny Henry: 1981
Paul Henry: 1983
Ruthie Henshall: 1997
Leslie Henson: 1954, 1955 (London)
Doreen Hermitage: 1958
Pat Heywood: 1955 (London)
Marilyn Hightower: 1947, 1949
Benny Hill: 1955 (London), 1959, 1960
Harry Hill: 1997
Vince Hill: 1982
Vera Hilliard: 1930
Marilyn Hill-Smith: 1990
Adam Hills: 2009
Ronnie Hilton: 1957, 1959
Bobbie Hind and his all-British Sonara Band: 1923
Dr Evadne Hinge and Dame Hilda Bracket: 1979, 1989
Pip Hinton: 1958
Thora Hird: 1954
Jack Hobbs: 1933
Edmund Hockridge: 1953
Patricia Hodge: 1990
Trio Hoganas: 1972
Dominic Holland: 2000
Jack Holland: 1934
Jeffrey Holland: 1990
Frank Holloway: 1947
Stanley Holloway: 1935, 1958
Celeste Holm: 1985
Ethel Hook: 1919, 1925
Hoops - The Boys: 1951
Bob Hope: 1954, 1962, 1967, 1977
Hope and Keen: 1965
The Hope Repertory Company: 1954
Rudy Horn: 1954
Kenneth Horne: 1951
Lena Horne: 1955 (London), 1964
Jane Horrocks: 2000
Hortobagyi Troupe: 1947
Robert Horton: 1960
The Houston Sisters: 1926
Big Howard, Little Howard: 2007
Simon Howe: 1986
Frankie Howerd: 1950, 1954, 1960, 1966, 1969
Bobby Howes: 1955 (London)
Sally Ann Howes: 1951
Roy Hudd: 1980, 1982, 1984
Huddersfield Choral Society: 1986
Dawn Hughes: 1958
Finola Hughes: 1983
Rod Hull and Emu: 1972
Tony Hulley: 1946, 1947
Engelbert Humperdinck: 1968
The Hungarian State Dance Company: 1974
Gloria Hunniford: 1982, 1985, 1986, 1992
Michael Hunt: 1945
George Hurd: 1925
Johnny Hutch and the Seven Volants: 1951
Bea Hutten: 1935
The Three Huxster Brothers: 1927, 1931
Jack Hylton: 1954
Jack Hylton and his band: 1926, 1928, 1932, 1934

I

Frank Ifield: 1962, 1965
Enrique Iglesias: 2002, 2007
Julio Iglesias: 1988
Il Divo: 2005
Ilford Girls Choir: 1952
John Inman: 1978, 1981, 1982
Italia Conti Academy of Theatre Arts Choir: 1994
Paulette Ivory: 1998

J

David Jacobs: 1984
Jack Jackie: 1946
Nat Jackley: 1946, 1950
The Jackson 5: 1972
Jack Jackson: 1952
Janet Jackson: 1990
Joe Jackson: 1935
J.W. Jackson's Twelve English Dancers: 1925
Hattie Jacques: 1958, 1960, 1963
Jamelia: 2004, 2006
Dick James: 1953
Jimmy James: 1953
Paddy James: 1958
Terry James: 1958
Dr Trevor James: 1997
Cassidy Janson: 2017
Eddie Jaye: 1923
Jean Louis Bert and Ilonka: 1959
Stephen Jefferies: 1986
Joy Jeffries: 1935
Roy Jeffries: 1945
Joan Jemison: 1958
Katherine Jenkins: 2005, 2007, 2009
The West End casts of Jersey Boys: 2008
George Jessel: 1955 (London)
Jethro: 2001
Jimmy Jewel: 1946, 1952, 1955 (Blackpool), 1959
Elton John: 1972, 2001, 2004, 2015
Bill Johnson: 1947, 1949
Gil Johnson: 1946
Teddy Johnson: 1957
Ulrika Jonsson: 1998
Jo, Jac and Joni: 1953
Jolson: 1995
Allan Jones: 1950
Aled Jones: 1986
Emrys Jones: 1955 (London)
Jack Jones: 1972, 1982
Ria Jones: 1992, 1994
Tom Jones: 1967, 1969, 1987, 1996
Vinnie Jones: 2001
David Jordan: 2007
The Jukebox Company: 1983
Jump: 2006

K

Kafka: 1934
Natasha Kaplinsky: 2004
Lola Karsavina: 1923
William Kat: 1938
Katrina and Joan: 1923
Karen Kay: 1982
Peter Kay: 1998
Beryl Kaye: 1945
Danny Kaye: 1948, 1980
Dave Kaye: 1951
Gloria Kaye: 1958
Ian Kaye: 1958
Stubby Kaye: 1953
The Kaye Sisters: 1957, 1965, 1978
Ronan Keating: 1998, 2000, 2002
Howard Keel: 1954, 1982, 1984, 1990
Gene Kelly: 1983
Matthew Kelly: 1984
Larry Kemble: 1928
Kris Kemo: 1975
Fred Kemp: 1923
Tony Kemp: 1983
Marie Kendall: 1932
Conn Kenna: 1926
Grace Kennedy: 1980, 1983
Nigel Kennedy: 1989
The Nigel Kennedy Ensemble: 1002
Sarah Kennedy: 1983
Betty Kent: 1938
Kentwood Junior School Choir: 1992
Carol Kenyon: 1995
David Kernan: 1979
The Keyboard Quintette: 1951
Chaka Khan: 2009
Kharum: 1922
Daphne Kiernander: 1948
Reginald Kilbey: 1930
Bobbie Kimber: 1947
The King and I: 2000
The King Brothers: 1958
The King Sisters: 1978
Barbara King: 1985
Dave King: 1955 (London)
Hetty King: 1958
Kathy Kirby: 1964
Alan King: 1977
Neville King: 1965
Wayne King: 1975
Nat King Cole: 1960
Iris Kirkwhite: 1932
Patricia Kirkwood: 1952, 1955 (London)
Kirsta and Kristel: 1948
Kit and The Widow: 1986
Eartha Kitt: 1958, 1962, 1987
Yuri Klevtsov: 1992
Beverley Knight: 2017
Peter Knight's Merry Makers: 1953
Koba and Kalee: 1946
Diana Krall: 2002
The Krankies: 1978
KwaZulu: 1975
Charlie Kunz: 1951

L

The West End cast of La Cage Aux Folles: 2008
Laine Theatre Arts Dancers: 1994, 1998, 2003
Cleo Laine: 1962, 1977, 1980
Frankie Laine: 1954
Robert Lamont: 1958
Robert Lamouret: 1946
George Lane: 1937
Lupino Lane: 1938, 1955 (Blackpool), 1955 (London)
Bonnie Langford: 1982, 1983, 1990
Chris Langham: 1982
Lang Lang: 2007
Diane Langton: 1978, 1982
Mario Lanza: 1957
La Pia: 1915
Danny La Rue: 1969, 1972, 1978
Latin American Formation Team: 1986
Latona, Graham and Chandel: 1955 (London)
Harry Lauder: 1912
Laurel and Hardy: 1947
Fay Laurie: 1958
Hugh Laurie: 1987
Jack La Vier: 1937
Stephanie Lawrence: 1981, 1985
The Syd Lawrence Orchestra: 1970
Ruth Lawson: 1958
Evelyn Laye: 1933, 1938
Andy Leach: 1997
Brenda Lee: 1964
Mary Lee: 1938
Peggy Lee: 1980
Jan Leeming: 1982, 1985
Jacques Legras: 1955 (London)
Adele Leigh: 1958
Lemar: 2004
Ute Lemper: 1997
Fay Lenore: 1954
Rula Lenska: 1985
Les 7 Doigts de la Main: 2009
Les Ballets Trockadero de Monte Carlo: 2008
Les Charlivels: 1949
The Two Leslies: 1938
Les Misérables: 1987
Alfred Lester: 1912, 1923
Harry Lester and his Hayseeds: 1946
Levanda: 1947
Levanda and the Nine Diamonds: 1932
Jerry Lewis: 1966, 1989
Len Lewis: 1937
Leona Lewis: 2008
Shari Lewis: 1969
The Six Lias from round about Regent Street: 1935
Liberace: 1959, 1960, 1972
Liberty X: 2002
Len Liggett: 1953
Marianne Lincoln: 1946
The West End cast of The Lion King: 1999, 2008
Maureen Lipman: 1985
Moira Lister: 1954
Little Angels Children’s Folk Ballet of Korea: 1971
Little Doreen: 1932
Little and Large: 1977
Little Tich: 1912
Littlewoods Girls Choir: 1955 (Blackpool)
Andrew Lloyd Webber: 1981
Julian Lloyd Webber: 1981, 1989
David Lober: 1950
Josef Locke: 1952
Johnny Lockwood: 1949
Cecilia Loftus: 1912
Jimmy Logan: 1957
Johnny Logan: 1987
London Choral Society: 1992
London Community Gospel Choir: 1992, 1993
Norman Long: 1927, 1931
Robert Longden: 1982
Joe Longthorne: 1989
Jennifer Lopez: 2001
Violet Loraine: 1919
Los Diablos Del Bombo: 1972
Los Paraguayos: 1963
Los Reales del Paraguay: 1976
Joe Loss and his Orchestra: 1963, 1980
Dennis Lotis: 1957
Marie Louise: 1947
Demi Lovato: 2014
Arthur Lucan: 1934
Jonathan Lucas: 1950
Ronn Lucas: 1987
Lulu: 1967, 1981, 1986, 1993, 1994, 2009
Alan and Blanche Lund: 1946, 1951
Ted Lune: 1959
The Luton Girls Choir: 1948
Kenny Lynch: 1981
Ralph Lynn: 1923
Vera Lynn: 1951, 1952, 1957, 1960, 1975, 1986, 1990
Carole Lynne: 1950, 1951
Jeff Lynne's ELO: 2015
Ben Lyon: 1957

M

Lee Mack: 2002
Shirley MacLaine: 1977
Ross MacManus: 1963
Aimi MacDonald: 1968
Mack & Mabel: 1995
Boyd MacKenzie: 1958
Ruth Madoc: 1982, 1986
Mr Magoo: 1984
Will Mahoney: 1935
Natalia Makarova: 1983
Freddie Malcom: 1947
Henry Mancini: 1966, 1980, 1984
Jason Manford: 2009, 2017
Barry Manilow: 1992, 1998, 1999, 2006
Ethel Manners: 1938
Jill Manners: 1945
Mantovani: 1958
Ennio Marchetto: 1998, 2004
Marimba Band 1923
Mariora: 1947
Alicia Markova: 1957
Alfred Marks: 1953, 1957
Jean Marsh: 1984
George Marshall: 1989
Jessica Martin: 1987
Millicent Martin: 1964, 1979, 1982
Willie Martin: 1958
Marvo and Dolores: 1966
Jasper Maskelyne: 1932
Jackie Mason: 1988, 1996, 2001
Monica Mason: 1983
Valerie Masterson: 1986
Mireille Mathieu: 1967, 1969, 1981
Jessie Matthews: 1935
Sheila Matthews: 1950
Susan Maughan: 1963
Ekaterina Maximova: 1979
Lisa Maxwell: 1990
Brian May: 2008
Clarice Mayne: 1912, 1919
Sylvester McCoy: 1982
Martine McCutcheon: 1998
Hugh McDermott: 1955 (London)
Ami McDonald: 1982
Jane McDonald: 2000
Ray McDonald: 1949
Malcolm McEachern: 1921
Geraldine McEwan: 1990
Brian McFadden: 2004
McFly: 2005
Debbie McGee: 1988
Alistair McGowan: 1995
Paddy McGuinness: 2009
The McGuire Sisters: 1961
Michael McGuire: 1987
Michael McIntyre: 2008
Kenneth McKellar: 1966
Virginia McKenna: 1979
Julia McKenzie: 1979, 1983
Craig McLachlan: 1993
 Stewart McPherson: 1948
Geraldine McQueen: 2008
Kitty McShane: 1934
The cast of Me and My Girl: 1938, 1984
Michael Meacham: 1955 (London)
Robert Meadmore: 1990, 2001
Meat Loaf: 2006
The Mecca Formation Dancers: 1958
The Carlo Medini Six: 1933
Medlock and Marlowe: 1952
Michael Medwin: 1959
The Melachrino Strings: 1948
Paul Melba: 1974
Katie Melua: 2003
G. S. Melvin: 1921, 1932, 1938
William and Joe Mendel: 1933
Men in Coats: 2002
The Frank and Kay Mercer Latin American Formation Team: 1983
Ethel Merman: 1982
Steve Merritt: 1983
Billy Merson: 1921, 1923
The Merry Macs: 1950
Mike Michaels: 1992
Bette Midler: 2009, 2014
Mika: 2009
Ann Miller: 1988
Max Miller: 1937, 1950
Patina Miller: 2009
Spike Milligan: 1965
Hayley Mills: 1990
John Mills: 1990
Nat Mills and Bobbie: 1946
Tim Minchin: 2011
Liza Minnelli: 2004
Borrah Minnevitch's Harmonica Rascals: 1947, 1949
Kylie Minogue: 1988, 2000, 2002, 2010, 2012, 2015
The Black and White Minstrels: 1962
The cast of Miranda: 2017
The Mirthful Jovers: 1922
Miss Saigon: 1991
Arthur Mitchell: 1976
The Eight Mitchell Singers: 1959
George Mitchell Choir: 1951, 1954, 1957, 1958
The George Mitchell Glee Club: 1950
Guy Mitchell: 1954
Margo Mitchell: 1958
Mary Mitchell: 1958
Roy Mitchell: 1945
Warren Mitchell: 1972
Albert Modley: 1955 (Blackpool)
The Moiseyev Dance Company: 1964
Momix - The White Widow: 2007
Mona and Oliver & The Girls: 1947
Bob Monkhouse: 1960, 1986, 1988, 1996, 2002
Matt Monro: 1966
Kelly Monteith: 1983
Ron Moody: 1968, 1985
Dudley Moore: 1965
Kathryn Moore: 1955 (Blackpool)
Roger Moore: 1990
Diana Moran: 1983
Gillian Moran: 1954
Morecambe and Wise: 1955 (Blackpool), 1961, 1964, 1968
Kenneth More: 1958
José Luis Moreno: 1973
Harry Moreny: 1946
Ivor Moreton: 1951
The Stuart Morgan Dancers: 1938
Terence Morgan: 1955 (London)
Patricia Morison: 1951
Karl Morley: 1958
Jonathon Morris: 1990
Lily Morris: 1927, 1931
James Morrison: 2006
Morriston Orpheus Choir: 1957
Doretta Morrow and Company: 1955 (London)
Moscow State Circus: 1996
Moscow State Folk Dance Company: 1955 (London)
Nana Mouskouri: 1973, 1986
Stella Moya: 1945
The Mudlarks: 1958
Irek Mukhamedov: 1990
Stephen Mulhern: 1997
Samantha Mumba: 2001
Hilda Mundy: 1933
Richard Murdoch: 1951
Olly Murs: 2013
Jim Henson's Muppets: 1977, 1993
Richard Murdoch: 1980
Murray and Mooney: 1934, 1938
Al Murray - The Pub Landlord: 2001, 2003, 2007
Pam Murray: 1953
Pete Murray: 1982
Rob Murray: 1952
Ruby Murray: 1955 (London)
Kacey Musgraves: 2015
The Myrons: 1948

N

Naldi: 1930
National Youth Jazz Orchestra: 1978
Naturally 7: 2008
Oscar Natzka: 1946
Naughton and Gold: 1932, 1933, 1935, 1946, 1947, 1950, 1951
Mary Naylor: 1946
The cast of Neighbours: 1988
Billy Nelson: 1945
Nadia Nerina: 1963, 1966
Nervo and Knox: 1925, 1930, 1932, 1933, 1935, 1947, 1950, 1951
The New Dollys: 1971
Raymond Newell: 1937
Bob Newhart: 1964
Anthony Newley: 1987
The New Seekers: 1971
Wayne Newton: 1966
Nicholas Brothers: 1948
Paul Nicholas: 1984, 1985, 1986, 1989
Billy Nicholls: 1945
Dandy Nichols: 1972
Joy Nichols: 1949, 1952
David Nixon: 1958, 1978
Eva Noblezada: 2014
The Nolan Sisters: 1978
Noni & Horace: 1928
Peter Noone & Herman's Hermits: 1970
Gloria Nord: 1953
Denis Norden: 1984
Norman and Ladd: 1950
Northern Ballet Theatre: 1989
Notre Dame de Paris: 2000
Rudolf Nureyev: 1973, 1977

O

Dara Ó Briain: 2004
Agnes O'Connell's London Irish Girl Pipers: 1968
Des O'Connor: 1969, 1995
Tom O'Connor: 1976
Talbot O'Farrell: 1925, 1938, 1948
Mary O'Hara: 1978
Chuck O'Neil: 1945
Hilary O'Neil: 1987
Sheila O'Neill: 1953, 1983
Tessie O'Shea: 1946
Cicely Oates: 1934
Ocklynge Junior School Choir: 1992
Oklahoma!: 1998
Pierre Olaf and Company: 1955 (London)
The cast of Oliver!: 1994
Vic Oliver: 1945, 1952
Omagh Community youth choir: 2000
Omar: 1933
David Omer: 2004
On the Town: 1985
On Your Toes: 1984
One Direction : 2012, 2014, 2015
Only Men Aloud!: 2008
The Oriental Swan: 2003
Ozzy Osbourne: 2004, 2005
Sharon Osbourne: 2004
Donny Osmond: 2001, 2003
Our House: 2002
Vladimir Ovchinnikov: 1987
Bill Owen: 1984

P

Elaine Paige: 1981, 1990, 1995, 2000
Roni Page: 1985
The Palace Girls: 1912
The Palladium Boys & Girls: 1946, 1954
The Palladium Girls: 1930, 1932
Sherman Fisher's Palladium Girls: 1933, 1934, 1935, 1937
Gaston Palmer: 1930
Paper Lace: 1974
Norrie Paramor's Big Ben Banjo Band: 1957
Merle Park: 1983
Phil Parke: 1949
Larry Parker: 1975
Louis Parker: 1923
Jack Parnell and his Orchestra: 1954, 1971, 1974, 1977
Pas de deux: 1979
Joe Pasquale: 1993, 1995, 1997, 1999, 2005
The Passing Zone: 1994
Nigel Patrick: 1954
Sir Les Patterson: 1984
Luciano Pavarotti: 2003
Jack Payne and his BBC band: 1930
Jack Payne's Orchestra: 1938
Sarah Payne: 1985
Tom Payne: 1930
Billy Pearce: 1994
Donald Peers: 1950
Peking Opera: 1986
The Pendragons: 1995
Penn & Teller: 2011
Pepe and his friends: 1978
Itzhak Perlman: 1981
The Billy Petch Dancers: 1963
Peter, Paul and Mary: 1965
Andi Peters: 1997
Clarke Peters: 1983
Sylvia Peters: 1951
Peters and Lee: 1973
The Five Petleys: 1921
The Phantom of the Opera: 1987
Van Phillips: 1945
Carolyn Pickles: 1986
Wilfred Pickles: 1949
Wilfred and Mabel Pickles: 1955 (Blackpool)
The cast of Pickwick: 1963, 1993
The Pietro Brothers: 1959, 1966
Pilobolus: 2009
Pinky and Perky with Jan and Vlasta Dalibor: 1963
Pipifax and Penlo: 1912
The Pirate King: 1982
The Pirates of Penzance: 1982
Gene Pitney: 1966
Nigel Planer: 1997
Bert Platt: 1934
Christine Pocket: 1958
David Poe: 2009
Su Pollard: 1985, 1986
Andre Portasio: 2005
Gillie Potter: 1930, 1938
Paul Potts: 2007
Lorna and Toots Pound: 1922
Sandy Powell: 1935, 1970, 1980
Chris Power: 1982
Michael Praed: 1982
Harry Prescott and his seven Hindustans: 1930
Pearl Primus and her Company: 1951
Arthur Prince: 1912, 1919, 1922
The Producers: 2004
Johnny Puleo: 1949
The Puppini Sisters: 2006
The Pussycat Dolls: 2008

Q

1st Battalion The Liverpool Scottish (T.A.) (Queen's Own Cameron Highlanders): 1955 (Blackpool)
Pauline Quirke: 1996

R

Jack Radcliffe: 1951
The Radio Revellers: 1948
Syd Railton: 1935
Rambert Dance Company: 1998
Alan Randall: 1986
Elsie Randolph: 1954
Esther Rantzen: 1978, 1982
Johnnie Ray: 1955 (London), 1987
Lynette Ray: 1958
Ted Ray: 1948, 1949, 1952
Al Read: 1954, 1955 (Blackpool), 1959
Ralph Reader's Gang Show: 1937, 1957, 1964
Rebla: 1921
Reggie Redcliffe: 1946
Amanda Redman: 1982
Arthur Reece: 1935
Brian Reece: 1954, 1955 (London), 1957
Angharad Rees: 1984, 1990
Sonia Rees: 1960
Joan Regan: 1955 (Blackpool)
Tomasz Reichelt: 2005
Beryl Reid: 1985
Mackenzie Reid: 1953
Renee and Godfrey: 1921
Ethel Revnell: 1937, 1953
Dorothy Reynolds: 1955 (London)
Rhos Male Voice Choir: 1975
Griff Rhys Jones: 1988, 1992
Anneka Rice: 1990
Reva Rice: 1992
Tim Rice: 1981, 1992
Buddy Rich: 1969
Cliff Richard: 1959, 1973, 1988, 1990, 1995, 1999, 2004, 2005
Cliff Richard & The Shadows: 1960, 1962, 1964, 1981, 2008
Juanita Richards: 1933
Lionel Richie: 2000
Shane Richie: 2004
André Rieu and the Johann Strauss Orchestra: 2009
Diana Rigg: 1989
Right Said Fred: 1992
Rihanna: 2008
Amber Riley: 2017
LeAnn Rimes: 1999
Angela Rippon: 1982, 1986
The cast of Riverdance: 1994, 1995
Joan Rivers: 1996, 2007
Harry Robertson: 1959
Liz Robertson: 1982, 1985
George Robey: 1912, 1919, 1934
Eric Robinson Orchestra & Singers: 1954
Robson & Jerome: 1995, 1996
Linda Robson: 1996
The Rockin' Berries: 1967
Lord Rockingham's XI: 1959
Rock Steady Crew: 1983
Anton Rodgers: 1982
Ginger Rogers: 1969
Ted Rogers: 1968, 1974
Romanian National Dance Company and Orchestra: 1967
The Roly Polys: 1983
Ronnie Ronalde: 1953
Mickey Rooney: 1988
Rosarito: 1937
Clarkson Rose: 1928
Julian Rose: 1930
Jonathan Ross: 1997
The Three Ross Sisters: 1946
Norman Rossington: 1959, 1985
Rostal and Schaefer: 1970
Round the Horne Revisited: 2004
Thomas Round: 1958
Gareth Rowan: 1994
Derek Roy: 1948
Harry Roy and his band: 1935
Royal Albert Hall Orchestra: 1923
Royal Ballet School: 1983, 1999
Band of the Royal Marines: 1949
Royal Variety Performance Dancers: 2000, 2004
Rita Rudner: 1992
Billy Russell: 1933, 1947, 1954
Fred Russell: 1932, 1952
Max Russell: 1958
Russian Blue Bird Players: 1923
Marion Ryan: 1959
Peggy Ryan: 1949

S

Alessandro Safina: 2001
The Three Sailors: 1934
Peter Sallis: 1984
Lea Salonga: 1991
The Mike Sammes Singers: 1969
George Sampson: 2008
Kenneth Sandford: 1955 (Blackpool)
John Sanger: 1949
Lon Satton: 1992
H. Gordon Saunders: 1930
Mervyn Saunders: 1947
Lily Savage: 1998
Telly Savalas: 1975
Scènes de ballet: 1969
Schaller Brothers: 1954
Phillip Schofield: 1992
Jacqui Scott: 1992
Selina Scott: 1989
ScottishPower Pipe Band: 2003
Kenny Seagrove: 1989
Seal: 2007
The Searchers: 1981
Harry Secombe: 1951, 1957, 1958, 1962, 1963, 1969, 1975, 1978, 1987, 1993
The Seekers: 1966
P. T. Selbit: 1922
Peter Sellers: 1954, 1965
Bruce Seton: 1955 (London)
Lynn Seymour: 1973
Three Shades: 1947
The Shaolin Monks: 1999
Reginald Sharland: 1921, 1923
Buster Shaver and his trio of Lilliputians: 1948
Martin Shaw: 1985
Sandie Shaw: 1967
George Shearing: 1987
Anne Shelton: 1953, 1959, 1978
Ned Sherrin: 1979
Scott Sherrin: 1983
Ella Shields: 1948
Jake Shimabukuro: 2009
Kaho Shimada: 1987
Dinah Shore: 1950
Showaddywaddy: 1978
Show Boat: 1985
The Showgirls: 1955 (Blackpool)
Victor Silvester and his Ballroom Orchestra: 1958
Jean Simmons: 1985
Joan Sims: 1954
The cast of Sister Act the Musical: 2009
The Skating Willers: 2005
Peter Skellern: 1982, 2000
Frank Skinner: 1994
Sky High Corps De Ballet: 1948
The Skyrockets Orchestra: 1948
Wayne Sleep: 1978, 1983, 1990
The cast of The Sleeping Beauty: 1963
James Smillie: 1983
Faryl Smith: 2009
The Five Smith Brothers: 1950, 1955 (Blackpool)
Mel Smith: 1988, 1992
Will Smith: 2004
Don Smoothey: 1982
The Soldiers: 2009
Zoltan Solymosi: 1994
Debroy Somers and his band: 1927, 1931
The cast of The Sound of Music: 2006
The cast of Spamalot: 2006
Johnnie Spence and his Orchestra: 1969
Peggy Spencer: 1986
Grace Spero: 1945
Spice Girls: 1997, 1998
Dennis Spicer: 1964
Dave Spikey: 2005
Victor Spinetti: 1982
Dusty Springfield: 1965
Dougie Squires' Second Generation: 1973
Paul Squires: 1980
Teddy St. Denis: 1938
Stanelli & Douglas: 1928
Stanley and Mae Quartette: 1934
Cyril Stapleton with the BBC Show Band: 1955 (London), 1958
Star for a Night: 2000
Alvin Stardust: 1981
The Stargazers: 1955 (London), 1958
Freddie Starr: 1970, 1989
Isla St Clair: 1982
Anthony Steel: 1954
Tommy Steele: 1963, 1966
Tommy Steele and his Steelmen: 1957
Gwen Stefani: 2004
Pamela Stephenson: 1982
Steps: 1999, 2020
Stetson: 1932
Rachel Stevens: 2003
Allan Stewart: 1987, 1995
Amii Stewart: 1979
Andy Stewart: 1961, 1962, 1978
Donald B. Stewart: 1954
Rod Stewart: 2006
Richard Stilgoe: 1982, 2000
Stomp: 1998, 2002
Rene Strange: 1946
David Strassman: 1996
Strathclyde Police Pipe Band: 2003
Elaine Stritch: 1979, 2002
Una Stubbs: 1972, 1980
The Stupids: 1971
Sugababes: 2006
Diana Ross and The Supremes: 1968
Randolph Sutton: 1948
Donald Swann: 1963
Eric Sykes: 1963
Frederick Sylvester: 1921

T

Andre Tahon and Company: 1968
Take That: 1994, 2006, 2008, 2010, 2018
Talk of the Town Girls and Boys: 1958
Valerie Tandy: 1947, 1951
Ray Tanva: 1958
Tanya: 1967
Jimmy Tarbuck: 1964, 1981, 1987, 1992, 2007
Chris Tarrant: 1992
Catherine Tate: 2005
Harry Tate: 1912, 1919, 1925, 1938
Jim Tavare: 1992, 1994, 1998
Teatro: 2007
Kiri Te Kanawa: 1990, 2007
The Temperance Seven: 1961
Bryn Terfel: 2000, 2005
Terry's Juveniles: 1950
The Alec Thomas Quartet: 1947
Terry-Thomas: 1946, 1952
Billy Thorburn: 1951
Tiller Girls: 1926, 1932, 1938, 1948, 1949, 1950, 1951, 1952, 1953, 1954, 1955 (Blackpool), 1957, 1959, 1960, 1964, 1984
Vesta Tilley: 1912
Christopher Timothy: 1982
Louis Tomlinson: 2015, 2017
Vittorio Togo: 1933
Topol: 1982
Mel Tormé: 1987
Totò: 1930
Bobby Tranter: 1946, 1947
Mr & Mrs Tree: 1925
Bruce Trent: 1954
Ann Trevor: 1923
Tommy Trinder: 1945, 1947, 1950, 1955 (London), 1980
Jack Tripp: 1955 (Blackpool)
Trix Sisters: 1922
George Truzzi: 1955 (Blackpool)
Sophie Tucker: 1962
Tommy Tune: 1983
Joan Turner: 1954
Tina Turner: 1989
Shania Twain: 2002
Twiggy: 1983

U

V

Henri Vadden: 1946
Caterina Valente: 1970
Valente Valente: 1968
Dickie Valentine: 1957
Francis Van Dyke: 1973
Denise Van Outen: 2001, 2004
Olga Varona: 1947
Sylvie Vartan: 1965
Vladimir Vasiliev: 1979
Frankie Vaughan: 1957, 1958, 1961, 1985
Malcolm Vaughan: 1957
The Veterans: 1969
Vesta Victoria: 1932, 1938
The Victoria Palace Girls and Boys: 1955, 1955 (Blackpool)
The Victoria Palace Girls: 1927, 1928, 1931, 1951
Vik and Fabrini: 1996
The Villams: 1971
Tim Vine: 2000
Vladimir: 1997
Arthur Vollum: 1946

W

Lisa Waddingham: 1989
Bill Waddington: 1955 (Blackpool)
Cherry Wainer: 1959
Douglas Wakefield: 1945
Celestine Walcott-Gordon: 2000
Roy Walker: 2009
David Wall: 1982, 1983
Max Wall: 1930, 1950
The Wallabies: 1946
Ian Wallace: 1952
Nellie Wallace: 1948
Shani Wallis: 1954
Tom Walls: 1923
Bradley Walsh: 1993, 1999, 2005
The Wall Street Crash: 1980, 1982
Thorley Walters: 1954
Amanda Waring: 1985
Jack Warner: 1953
John Warner: 1955 (London)
Jacqueline Warrell: 1958
Warren, Latona and Sparks: 1948, 1952
Jeff Warren: 1952
Ben Warriss: 1946, 1952, 1955 (Blackpool), 1959, 1980
Dionne Warwick: 1970
Dennis Waterman: 1982, 1985
Elsie and Doris Waters: 1934, 1938
Lovelace Watkins: 1971
Adam Watkiss: 2001
Dilys Watling: 1978
Russell Watson: 2001
Dorothy Elizabeth Webb: 1953
Marti Webb: 1986
Tom Webster: 1922
Elisabeth Welch: 1979, 1985
Harry Weldon: 1922
Doreen Wells: 1985
Ruth Welting: 1975
Chen Wen: 2003
Señor Wences: 1937
Gracie West: 1937
Kanye West: 2007
Hayley Westenra: 2003
The Western Brothers: 1935
Westlife: 1999, 2000, 2003
Jimmy Wheeler: 1954
Albert Whelan: 1927, 1931
Dawn White and her Glamazons: 1954
Joyce White: 1958
Kay White: 1970
Sheila White: 1983
Willard White: 1990
David Whitfield: 1954, 1957
June Whitfield: 1978
The cast of Wicked: 2006
The Wiere Brothers: 1951
Brian Wilde: 1984
Marty Wilde: 1959, 1981
Colm Wilkinson: 1991, 2010
Edmund Willard: 1955 (London)
Andy Williams: 1970
Bransby Williams: 1926, 1938
John Williams: 1977
Mark Williams: 2000
Myles Williams: 1935
Ylvia 'Kuuma' Williams: 1981
Roy Willis: 1938
Gary Wilmot: 1985, 1987, 1994
Osmund Wilson: 1934
Precious Wilson: 1981
Robert Wilson: 1947
Terry Wilson: 1959
Wilson, Keppel and Betty: 1933, 1945, 1947
Robb Wilton: 1926,
Anona Winn: 1938, 1951
Bernie Winters: 1982, 1984, 1987, 1990
Mike & Bernie Winters: 1962
Norman Wisdom: 1952, 1954, 1958, 1960, 1985
Terry Wogan: 1984, 1994
Donald Wolfit: 1954
Hua Wong: 2003
Eva May Wong: 1947
Georgie Wood: 1927, 1931
Victoria Wood: 1986
Eli Woods: 1982
Edward Woodward: 1989
Billie Worth: 1952
Harry Worth: 1958, 1960, 1980
Belinda Wright: 1959
Helen Wright: 1958
Hannah Wyatt: 1935

X
Wen Xiaoyan: 2003

Y

Yana: 1958
Mike Yarwood: 1972, 1975, 1976, 1987
Erica Yorke: 1951
Mary Young: 1937
Will Young: 2002, 2005
The Young Generation: 1971
Jelke Yuresha: 1959

Z

Anatoliy Zalevsky: 2001
Lena Zavaroni: 1976
Paul Zerdin: 1999, 2002, 2009
Anne Ziegler: 1945
The West End cast of Zorro: 2008
The Zoris: 1947

External links
Official website

Royal Variety Performance